Ichhapur is a census town in the Faridpur Durgapur CD block in the Durgapur subdivision of the Paschim Bardhaman district in the Indian state of West Bengal.

Geography

Location

Banagram, Mandarbani, Sirsha, Nabaghanapur, Sarpi and Ichhapur form a series of census towns along the western border of Faridpur-Durgapur CD block.

Urbanisation
According to the 2011 census, 79.22% of the population of the Durgapur subdivision was urban and 20.78% was rural. The Durgapur subdivision has 1 municipal corporation at Durgapur and 38 (+1 partly) census towns  (partly presented in the map alongside; all places marked on the map are linked in the full-screen map).

Demographics
According to the 2011 Census of India, Ichhapur had a total population of 4,795 of which 2,483 (52%) were males and 2,312 (48%) were females. Population in the age range years was 484. The total number of literate persons in Ichhapur was 3,375 (78.29% of the population over 6 years).

*For language details see Faridpur Durgapur#Language and religion

Infrastructure

According to the District Census Handbook 2011, Bardhaman, Ichhapur covered an area of 2.5324 km2. Among the civic amenities, the protected water-supply involved overhead tank, uncovered well, hand pump. It had 414 domestic electric connections. Among the medical facilities it had 1 hospital, 1 dispensary/ health center, 4 medicine shops. Among the educational facilities it had were 2 primary schools, 1 middle school, 1 secondary school, 1 senior secondary school. It had 1 non-formal education centre (Sarva Shiksha Abhiyan). Among the important commodities it produced were paddy, wheat and rice.

Economy
As per the ECL website telephone numbers, operational collieries in the Bankola Area of Eastern Coalfields in 2018 are: Bankola Colliery, Khandra Colliery, Kumardih A Colliery, Kumardih B Colliery, Moira Colliery, Nakrakonda Colliery, Shankarpur Colliery, Shyamsundarpur Colliery and Tilaboni Colliery.

Education
Ichapur N.C. High School is a Bengali-medium coeducational institution established in 1965. It has facilities for teaching from class V to class XII. The school has 13 computers, a library with 1,500 books and a playground.

Healthcare
There is a primary health centre, with 6 beds, at Lowapur, PO Ichhapur.

References

Cities and towns in Paschim Bardhaman district